The Yelcho was built in 1906 by the Scottish firm Geo. Brown and Co. of Greenock, on the River Clyde for towage and cargo service of the Chilean Sociedad Ganadera e Industrial Yelcho y Palena, Puerto Montt. In 1908 she was sold to the Chilean Navy and ordered to Punta Arenas as a tug and for periodic maintenance and supply of the lighthouses in that region. 


The rescue of the Imperial Trans-Antarctic Expedition

After the dramatic voyage of the James Caird, Ernest Shackleton had attempted and failed three times to rescue the crew left on Elephant Island: the ships Southern Sky (loaned by the English Whaling Co, 23–31 May 1916), Instituto de Pesca N°1 (loaned by the Government of Uruguay, 10–16 June 1916) and Emma (a sealer, funded by the British Club, Punta Arenas, 12 July – 8 August 1916) all failed to reach Elephant Island.

At dawn on 7 August Yelcho under the command of Captain Luis Pardo was ordered to Port Stanley in order to tug Emma and the British explorers back to Punta Arenas to make a fourth attempt.

The Chilean government offered Yelcho although she was totally unsuited for operations in Antarctic waters.

On 25 August 1916 at 12:15 am, she sailed bound for Elephant Island with 22 men under command of Pardo, carrying Shackleton, Frank Worsley and Tom Crean. After making it safely through the complex tides and channels of the west side of the Tierra del Fuego, Yelcho headed out into the Beagle Channel.

On the 27th at 11:15 am, she arrived at Picton Island, where she bunkered 300 sacks of coal (a total of 72 tons were in the ship) from the Puerto Banner Naval Station.  The process was completed within only 12 hours and on 28 August at 3:30 pm she weighed anchor and left for Elephant Island.  south of Cape Horn the lookout spotted the first icebergs

At 11:40 am on 30 August, the fog lifted and the camp on Elephant Island was spotted, and Yelcho immediately entered the bay. Within an hour, in two trips of a small boat, all the Elephant Island party were safely aboard Yelcho, which sailed for Punta Arenas.

The 23 crew of Yelcho at the rescue was:

Aftermath

After the successful rescue mission of 1916 the name Yelcho has been given to streets and ships of Chile, particularly to Chile's southernmost coastal Puerto Williams, and it is there that the prow of the Yelcho has been preserved and is prominently displayed as a tribute to Captain Pardo's ship and crew.

In 1945, the ship was decommissioned and used as tender in the Petty officer School of the Chilean Navy. On 27 January 1958 Yelcho was retired by decree 190 and in 1962 sold to ASMAR under terms of Law 14.564 (5 May 1954) for 300,000 CLP.

See also
List of Antarctic exploration ships from the Heroic Age, 1897–1922

References

See also

1906 ships
Ships built on the River Clyde
Auxiliary ships of the Chilean Navy